Fossil collecting (sometimes, in a non-scientific sense, fossil hunting) is the collection of fossils for scientific study, hobby, or profit. Fossil collecting, as practiced by amateurs, is the predecessor of modern paleontology and many still collect fossils and study fossils as amateurs. Professionals and amateurs alike collect fossils for their scientific value. A commercial trade in fossils has also long existed, with some of this being practised illegally.

Process

Locating fossils

Rock type
Fossils are generally found in sedimentary rock with differentiated strata representing a succession of deposited material. The occurrence of fossil bearing material depends on environmental factors before and after the time of preservation. After death, the first preserving factor is a rapid burial in water bodies or terrestrial sediment which would help in preserving the specimen. These rocks types are usually termed clastic rock, and are further subdivided into fine, medium and coarse grained material. While fossils can be found in all grain types, more detailed specimens are found in the fine grained material. A second type of burial is the non-clastic rock, form where the rock is made up of the precipitation of compacted fossil material, types of rock include limestone and coal. The third fossil bearing material is the evaporates, which precipitate out of concentrated dissolved salts to form nodular deposits, examples include rock salt and phosphate concentrations. The evaporates are usually associated with gastropod, algae, vertebrate, and trace fossils. Fossils are not to be found in areas of igneous rock (except in some beds between lava flows). In rocks which have undergone metamorphism, fossils are generally so distorted that they are difficult to recognize or have been destroyed completely.

Preservation
After burial various factors are at work to endanger the current fossil's preserved state. Chemical alteration would change the mineral composition of the fossil, but generally not its appearance, lithification would distort its appearance, the fossil itself may be fully or partially dissolved leaving only a fossil mold.

Exposure

Areas where sedimentary rocks are being eroded include exposed mountainous areas, river banks and beds, wave washed sea cliffs, and engineering features like quarries and road cuts. Coal mining operations often yield excellent fossil plants, but the best ones are to be found not in the coal itself but in the associated sedimentary rock deposits called coal measures.

Wave-washed sea cliffs and foreshore exposures are often good places to search for fossils, but always be aware of the state of the tides in the area. Never take chances by climbing high cliffs of crumbling rock or clay (many have died attempting it). Dried up natural lake beds  and caves in the form of pitfall traps  frequently also have high concentrations of fossils (e.g., Cuddie Springs and Naracoorte Caves in Australia).

Generally in appearance, a fossil will be either a different colour to the surrounding rock, because of the different mineral content, will have a defining shape and texture or a combination of both. A fossil can also be extracted from its geological environment, having similar characteristics in colour naturally embed from the sedimentary formation (surrounding rock) it was found within.

Collecting techniques
The techniques used to collect fossils vary depending on the sediment or rock in which the fossils are to be found. For collecting in rock a geological hammer, a variety of cold chisels and a mallet are used to split and break rocks to reveal fossils. Since the rock is deposited in layers, these layers may be split apart to reveal fossils. For soft sediments and unconsolidated deposits, such as sands, silts, and clays, a spade, flat-bladed trowel, and stiff brushes are used. Sieves in a variety of mesh sizes are used to separate fossils from sands and gravels. Sieving is a rougher technique for collecting fossils and can destroy fragile ones. Sometimes, water is run through a sieve to help remove silt and sand. This technique is called wet sieving

Fossils tend to be very fragile and are generally not extracted entirely from the surrounding rock (the matrix) in the field. Cloth, cotton, small boxes and aluminum foil are frequently used to protect fossils being transported. Occasionally, large fragile specimens may need to be protected and supported using a jacket of plaster before their removal from the rock. If a fossil is to be left in situ, a cast may be produced, using plaster of paris or latex. While not preserving every detail, such a cast is inexpensive, easier to transport, causes less damage to the environment, and leaves the fossil in place for others. Fossilized tracks are frequently documented with casts. Subtle fossils which are preserved solely as impressions in sandy layers, such as the Ediacaran fossils, are also usually documented by means of a cast, which shows detail more clearly than the rock itself.

Preparation and cleaning

Sometimes, for smaller fossils, a stiff brush may simply be used to dust off and clean the fossil. For larger fossils, a chisel can be used to remove large bits of dirt, however, you run the risk of damaging the fossil.
Running water can cause some types of fossils to either dislodge from the rock, or even crumble and break apart, for they are very fragile. Dental tools are sometimes used to remove small amounts of rock from the fossil.

Documentation
A knowledge of the precise location a fossil is essential if the fossil is to have any scientific value. Details of the parent rock strata, the location of the find, and other fossil material associated with the find help scientists to place the fossil in context, in terms of the time, location and situation in which the organism lived. Data logs, photographs, and sketches may accompany detailed field notes to assist in the locating of a fossiliferous outcrop. Individual fossils are ideally cataloged with a locality number and a unique specimen number. This allows a collection to be easily searched and specimens located. Catologing of collections is almost universal in large institutions like museums.

Collecting ethics
To collect fossils, there are various legal realities that must be observed. Permission should be sought before collection begins on private land. Hammering the rocks in national parks and other areas of natural beauty is often discouraged and in most cases is illegal.

The first expressly worded fossil-collecting code was published from the museum-home of pioneering geologist Hugh Miller at Cromarty, on the Highland east coast of Scotland, 11 April 2008. It was introduced by Michael Russell, Minister for Environment, Scotland, as part of celebrations honouring the bicentennial of the founding of the Geological Society of London.  The code supplements an existing draft drawn up by English Nature.

The code advises fossil collectors to seek permission from landowners, to collect responsibly, record details, seek advice on finding an unusual fossil and label  the specimens and care for them. Its principles establish a framework of advice on best practices in the collection, identification, conservation and storage of fossil specimens.

The non-binding code of ethics for this field was drawn up by Scottish Natural Heritage (SNH) following many months of consultation with fossil collectors, landowners, palaeontological researchers, and staff of Scotland's museums.

Fossil trade

 
Fossil trading is the practice of buying and selling fossils. This is illegal when it comes to stolen fossils, and some important scientific specimens are sold to collectors, rather than given or obtained by museums and institutes of study. Much focus has been put on the illegal fossil dealing in China, where many specimens have been stolen. The fossil trade of Morocco has also been the focus of international attention. The trade is lucrative, and many celebrities collect fossils.

The Society of Vertebrate Paleontology (SVP), an international association of professional and amateur vertebrate paleontologists, believes that scientifically important fossils—especially but not exclusively those found on public lands—should be held in perpetuity in the public trust, preferably in a museum or research institution, where they can benefit the scientific community as a whole as well as future generations.  In the United States, Paleontological Resources Preservation Act. S. 546 and H. R. 2416 were introduced in the US Congress with SVP's full support.

Many commercial fossil collectors and dealers believe that such policies are a breach of their rights. The argument has also been put forth that there are too few professional paleontologists to collect and preserve fossils currently exposed to the elements, and that it is therefore essential that private citizens be allowed to collect them for the sake of their preservation. Eric Scott, the Curator of Paleontology for the San Bernardino County Museum, argues that 1) private citizens and amateur (not for profit) collectors can and do participate frequently in the permitted recovery and preservation of significant vertebrate fossils, and 2) preservation of significant fossils does not require or mandate sale of those fossils.

According to the ethics by-law of SVP, "The barter, sale, or purchase of scientifically significant vertebrate fossils is not condoned, unless it brings them into or keeps them within a public trust."

Some fossil trade is not for collecting but due to the use of certain fossils in traditional medicine mainly in East Asia but also in Europe and other places.

Societies and clubs
Many  include fossil collectors. Lapidary clubs also include fossil collectors. In addition, paleontological societies and fossil clubs exist. There is some overlap between fossil collecting, mineral collecting, and amateur geology.

Notable fossil collectors
Mary Anning
Robert Bakker
Edward Drinker Cope
Phil Currie
Othniel Charles Marsh
Paul Sereno
Charles Hazelius Sternberg
Peter Larson
Stan Wood
Fisk Holbrook Day
Triebold Paleontology Incorporated

See also
 Fossil park
 Lapidary club
 List of fossil sites
 Mineral collecting
 National Fossil Day
 Paleontologist
 Paleozoology
 Prehistoric life

References

Further reading
 Adrienne Mayor, The First Fossil Hunters: Paleontology in Greek and Roman Times (Princeton University Press 2000) — 
 Adrienne Mayor, Fossil Legends of the First Americans (Princeton University Press 2005) —

External links
 Fossil collecting locations in Europe and the rest of the World
 Fossil hunting for beginners
 Fossil collecting sites in the United States with very detailed information and directions

Collecting
Fossils